Monodryxus crassus is a species of beetle in the family Carabidae, the only species in the genus Monodryxus.

References

Pterostichinae